Andrew James Garcia (born April 22, 1986) is an American former professional baseball second baseman. Prior to beginning his professional career, he played college baseball at the University of California, Riverside. Garcia has also competed for the United States national baseball team.

Career
Garcia attended Valhalla High School. He went to college at University of California, Riverside, where he played college baseball for the UC Riverside Highlanders baseball team in the Big West Conference of the National Collegiate Athletic Association's (NCAA) Division I. He was Big West Conference All-Star second baseman in 2008.

Garcia was then selected by White Sox in the 21st round (630th overall) of the 2008 Major League Baseball draft. He made his professional debut in 2008 with the Bristol White Sox of the Rookie-level Appalachian League. In 2009, he played for the Kannapolis Intimidators of the Class-A South Atlantic League. He played for the Winston-Salem Dash of the Class-A Advanced Carolina League in 2010, in which he was recognized as having the best season among all White Sox minor league second baseman, despite missing time due to a torn ankle ligament. In 2011, he played for the Birmingham Barons of the Class-AA Southern League and the Charlotte Knights of the Class-AAA International League.

Garcia played for the United States national baseball team in the 2011 Baseball World Cup and the 2011 Pan American Games, winning the silver medal. He elected free agency from the Chicago White Sox organization on November 6, 2015.

Personal life
Garcia's grandfather, Dave Garcia, is a retired Major League Baseball (MLB) player and manager. His brother, Greg, played in MLB.

References

External links

1986 births
Living people
American people of Spanish descent
Baseball pitchers
Baseball players at the 2011 Pan American Games
Baseball players from California
Birmingham Barons players
Bristol White Sox players
Charlotte Knights players
Colorado Springs Sky Sox players
Kannapolis Intimidators players
Pan American Games silver medalists for the United States
Pan American Games medalists in baseball
Sportspeople from El Cajon, California
UC Riverside Highlanders baseball players
United States national baseball team players
Winston-Salem Dash players
Medalists at the 2011 Pan American Games